Gerd Rasp (* born 10 May 1960, Bad Reichenhall) is a German physician of otorhinolaryngology with the additional specialties of plastic surgery and allergology. He is a professor and chairman of the hospital for otorhinolaryngology and dean for research affairs af the Paracelsus Private Medical University of Salzburg Austria . He is known for his work in the fields of rhinology and tympanic surgery.

Education 
After courses of mathematics and physics at the Ludwig Maximilian University of Munich (LMU) 1980-81 Rasp studied medicine from 1981 to 87 in Munich.

In 1985 he joined the research laboratory of the hospital for otorhinolaryngology at the LMU Munich. In 1987 he joined the hospital for otorhinolaryngology at LMU Munich as a scientific assistant. That year he was appointed as physician. In 1989 he earned magna cum laudedasoctor of medicine. He finished his specialist training for otorhinolaryngology in 1992. In 1994 he became functional attending chief resident and finished his habilitation in 1995 with a work on local medical diagnosis of the immune system for the dried nasal mucus.

Career 
Rasp built a work group and assisted 21 dissertations and two habilitations. In 1997 he reached venia legendi as Dr. med. habil. and was named '"Privatdozent". He took over cochlea implementation at the hospital for otorhinolaryngology. He set up a team with a fivefold increase in surgery. In 2001 he became attending deputy. In 2003 he was named associate professor.

In 2005 he became medical director of the otorhinolaryngological hospital at the Katharinenhospital Stuttgart. In 2008 he was named chairman of the hospital for otorhinolaryngology. In 2013 he became dean for research affairs at the Paracelsus Private Medical University of Salzburg Austria.

Rasp went abroad for advanced training: 1996 in Amsterdam (rhino-plasticity), 1998 in Zurich (base of skull surgery), 2000 in Miami (tympanic surgery and cochlea implantation) and 2004 in New Orleans (base of skull surgery).

Scientific contribution 
At first Rasp undertook experimental work with the active sequencing of the ovinal inter-alpha trypsin inhibitor. Later he focussed on subjects in allergology and rhinology. A focal point was the analysis of local nasal fluid and tissue, mainly regarding inflammation mechanisms, producing the majority of his scientific publications. More, common papers came from work with his team. Rasp's habilitation addressed inflammation parameters of local medical diagnosis of the immune system for the dried nasal mucus. In the context of clinical activities in Munich and Stuttgart Rasp took part in a research network for paraglioms under Hartmut Neumann, Freiburg. In Salzburg Rasp expanded the neuro-otological work group.

Academic memberships 
 Verband der Leitenden Krankenhausärzte Österreichs (VLKÖ)
 Österreichische Gesellschaft für Hals-Nasen-Ohrenheilkunde
 Deutsche Gesellschaft für Hals-Nasen-Ohrenheilkunde 
 European Academy of Facial Plastic surgery (EAFPS)
 European Academy of Allergy and Clinical Immunology (EAACI)
 Deutsche Gesellschaft für Schädelbasischirurgie
 German Society for Plastic And Reconstructive Surgery (DGPW)

Rasp is or was a member in the advisory board or in the editor committee of the following scientific journals:
 2012 Laryngo-Rhino-Otologie (coeditor) 
 2012 Laryngoscope (editorial board)

Awards 
1996 Editor's choice award of LOOK SMART for the first website in the German otorhinolaryngology

Publications 
PubFacts

ResearchGate

References

External links 
 Paracelsus Private Medical University of Salzburg. University hospital for otorhinolaryngology
 Paracelsus Private Medical University: Research Office
 Interview of SpringerMedizin.at with Gerd Rasp

1960 births
Living people
German otolaryngologists